Otto Hamlin "Jack" Saltzgaver (January 23, 1903 – February 1, 1978) was an American professional baseball player. The native of Croton, Iowa, as an infielder, appeared in 278  Major League Baseball games for the New York Yankees (1932; 1934–1937) and the Pittsburgh Pirates (1945).

His best MLB season came with the  Yankees. At age 31, he was the Bombers' most-used third baseman, appearing in 84 games at the position. He batted a career-high .271 and set personal bests in home runs (6) and runs batted in (36). The following year, he was supplanted by Red Rolfe as the Yanks' starter at the hot corner.

At the time he played for the Pirates, during the last season of the World War II manpower shortage, the 42-year-old Saltzgaver was the oldest active Major League player.

In 278 games over six seasons, Saltzgaver posted a .260 batting average (199-for-764) with 131 runs, 10 home runs, 82 RBI and 105 bases on balls. He recorded a .957 fielding percentage playing at third, second and first base.

References

External links

1903 births
1978 deaths
Baseball players from Iowa
Kansas City Blues (baseball) players
Major League Baseball second basemen
Major League Baseball third basemen
Minor league baseball managers
Newark Bears (IL) players
New York Yankees players
Oklahoma City Indians players
Ottumwa Packers players
People from Lee County, Iowa
Pittsburgh Pirates players
St. Paul Saints (AA) players
Wilmington Blue Rocks (1940–1952) players
Kansas City Blues (baseball) managers